The 2009 Six-red World Championship (styled the 888sport.com 6Red World Championship, among other spellings, for sponsorship and marketing purposes) was a six-red snooker tournament that took place between 14 and 18 December 2009 at the INEC in Killarney, Republic of Ireland. The tournament was sponsored by online bookmaker 888sport.

The field of 118 players were divided into twenty groups of five and three groups of six. Twenty-eight competitors were on the 2009/2010 professional Main Tour. During the tournament Michael White compiled the fastest 75 maximum break in the group stage with 2 minutes and 28 seconds.

Mark Davis won in the final 6–3 against Mark Williams.


Group stage

Group A

 Declan Brennan 4–1 Martin Divilly
 Igor Figerideo 4–0 Kevin Bowman
 Ricky Walden 4–0 Kevin Bowman
 Ricky Walden 3–4 Declan Brennan
 Igor Figueiredo 4–0 Martin Divilly
 Martin Divilly 4–2 Kevin Bowman
 Igor Figueiredo 4–0 Declan Brennan
 Ricky Walden 4–1 Martin Divilly
 Declan Brennan 4–1 Kevin Bowman
 Ricky Walden 4–2 Igor Figueiredo

Group B

 Reanne Evans 4–1 Aaron Doran
 Aditya Mehta 4–0 James Corbett
 John Higgins 4–1 James Corbett
 Reanne Evans 4–3 John Higgins
 Aditya Mehta 4–1 Aaron Doran
 Reanne Evans 4–0 James Corbett
 Aaron Doran 1–4 John Higgins
 Aditya Mehta 4–2 Reanne Evans
 John Higgins 3–4 Aditya Mehta
 Aaron Doran 4–3 James Corbett

Group C

 John Torpey 4–2 Daniel Dempsey
 Jamie Jones 4–2 Adel Omar Meawad
 Jamie Jones 4–0 Daniel Dempsey
 David Morris 4–2 John Torpey
 David Morris 4–0 Adel Omar Meawad
 Jamie Jones 4–1 John Torpey
 David Morris 4–1 Daniel Dempsey
 John Torpey 4–0 Adel Omar Meawad
 Jamie Jones 4–0 David Morris
 Daniel Dempsey 4–0 Adel Omar Meawad

Group D

 Gareth Allen 4–0 John Coxes
 Mario Fernandez 4–0 Gavin Stokes
 Ryan Day 4–1 Robbie Walker
 Mario Fernandez 4–0 John Coxes
 Ryan Day 4–1 Gareth Allen
 Mario Fernandez 4–1 Robbie Walker
 Ryan Day 4–1 Gavin Stokes
 Ryan Day 4–0 John Coxes
 Gareth Allen 4–1 Gavin Stokes
 Gavin Stokes 4–0 John Coxes
 Gareth Allen 4–0 Robbie Walker
 Ryan Day 4–1 Mario Fernandez
 Robbie Walker 4–0 Gavin Stokes
 Gareth Allen 4–1 Mario Fernandez

Group E

 Clinton Franey 4–2 Michael Bumster
 Liam Highfield 2–4 Eissa Al Sayed
 Marco Fu 4–1 Clinton Franey
 Esissa Al Sayed 4–0 Michael Bumster
 Marco Fu 1–4 Liam Highfield
 Liam Highfield 4–0 Michael Bumster
 Eissa al Sayed 4–3 Clinton Franey
 Marco Fu 4–2 Michael Bumster
 Marco Fu 4–1 Eissa Al Sayed
 Liam Highfield 4–2 Clinton Franey

Group F

 Itaro Santos 4–0 Patrick Lally
 Shea Brereton 0–4 Stephen Hendry
 Lucky Vatnani 4–3 Itaro Santos
 Stephen Hendry 4–3 Lucky Vatnani
 Shea Brereton 4–0 Patrick Lally
 Lucky Vatnani 4–0 Patrick Lally
 Itaro Santos 4–2 Shea Brereton
 Stephen Hendry 4–0 Patrick Lally
 Stephen Hendry 4–2 Itaro Santos
 Lucky Vatnani 4–1 Shea Brereton

Group G

 Mohamed Shehab 4–0 Sean McGonagle
 Mark Joyce 4–2 Muhammed Atiq
 Sean McGonagle 0–4 Raymond McHugh
 Mark Joyce 4–2 Mohammed Shehab
 Muhammed Atiq 4–0 Raymond McHugh
 Muhammed Atiq 4–0 Sean McGonagle
 Mohammed Shehab 4–0 Raymond McHugh
 Mark Joyce 4–0 Sean McGonagle
 Mohammed Shehab 4–3 Muhammed Atiq
 Mark Joyce 4–0 Raymond McHugh

Group H

 Joe Perry 4–0 Oliver Brown
 Robert Murphy 4–0 Kevin O'Leary
 Oliver Brown 4–0 Kevin O'Leary
 Joe Perry 4–3 Mohammed Al Joker
 Mohammed Al Joker 2–4 Robert Murphy
 Mohammed Al Joker 4–0 Kevin O'Leary
 Joe Perry 4–0 Robert Murphy
 Mohammed Al Joker 4–1 Oliver Brown
 Joe Perry 4–0 Kevin O'Leary
 Oliver Brown 0–4 Robert Murphy

Group I

 Andrew Pagett 4–0 David Foran
 Mark King 4–0 Alan Cleary
 Mark King 4–0 David Foran
 Andrew Pagett 4–1 Darren Merza
 Mark King 4–0 Mike Hallett
 Mike Hallett 4–2 Darren Merza
 David Foran 4–0 Alan Cleary
 Darren Merza 4–0 Alan Cleary
 Andrew Pagett 4–1 Mike Hallett
 Andrew Pagett 4–0 Alan Cleary
 Darren Merza 4–0 David Foran
 Mike Hallett 4–1 David Foran
 Mark King 4–0 Darren Merza
 Mike Hallett 4–0 Alan Cleary
 Mark King 4–2 Andrew Pagett

Group J

 Leo Fernandez 4–0 Dane Mulpeter
 Ian Glover 4–3 Joe Corrigan
 Mark Williams 4–1 Dane Mulpeter
 Mark Williams 4–3 Ian Glover
 Leo Fernandez 4–3 Joe Corrigan
 Mark Williams 4–2 Joe Corrigan
 Ian Glover 4–1 Dane Mulpeter
 Joe Corrigan 4–3 Dane Mulpeter
 Mark Williams 4–0 Leo Fernandez
 Leo Fernandez 4–3 Ian Glover

Group L

 Vincent Muldoon 4–1 Paul Mount
 Michael Smyth 4–3 Brendan Thomas
 Barry Hawkins 4–2 Paul Mount
 Barry Hawkins 4–0 Michael Smyth
 Vincent Muldoon 4–2 Brendan Thomas
 Barry Hawkins 4–0 Brendan Thomas
 Michael Smyth 4–3 Paul Mount
 Vincent Muldoon 4–1 Michael Smyth
 Brendan Thomas 4–1 Paul Mount
 Barry Hawkins 4–2 Vincent Muldoon

Group M

 David Cassidy 3–4 Damien Long
 Adam Duffy 4–3 Philip Wildman
 David Cassidy 0–4 Jamie Cope
 Philip Wildman 4–1 Damien Long
 Jamie Cope 4–1 Adam Duffy
 Adam Duffy 4–0 Damian Long
 Philip Wildman 4–0 David Cassidy
 Jamie Cope 4–0 Damien Long
 Adam Duffy 4–0 David Cassidy
 Jamie Cope 4–0 Philip Wildman

Group N

 Mitchell Mann 4–0 Chris Kilcoyle
 Stephen Sherry 4–2 Dave Harold
 Mitchell Mann 4–1 Joseph McClaren
 Joseph McClaren 1–4 Dave Harold
 Chris Kilcoyne 0–4 Stephen Sherry
 Mitchell Mann 4–2 Stephen Sherry
 Joseph McClaren 4–1 Chris Kilcoyle
 Dave Harold 4–0 Chris Kilcoyle
 Joseph McClaren 0–4 Stephen Sherry
 Dave Harold 4–1 Mitchell Mann

Group P

 Neil Craycraft 4–1 Muhammed Siddiq
 James Fennessy 2–4 Stuart Bingham
 Stuart Bingham 4–3 Brendan O'Donoghue
 Brendan O'Donoghue 4–2 Neil Craycraft
 Brendan O'Donoghue 4–0 Muhammed Siddiq
 Neil Craycraft 4–0 James Fennessy
 Stuart Bingham 4–1 Neil Craycraft
 Brendan O'Donoghue 4–1 James Fennessy
 Stuart Bingham 4–0 Muhammed Siddiq
 Muhammed Siddiq 0–4 James Fennessy

Group Q

 John Rea 4–1 Philip Burke
 Joe Swail 4–2 Ernie McMullen
 Michael White 3–4 Philip Burke
 Michael White 4–0 Ernie McMullan
 Joe Swail 4–2 John Rea
 Philip Burke 4–2 Ernie McMullen
 Michael White 4–2 John Rea
 John Rea 4–0 Ernie McMullen
 Joe Swail 4–1 Philip Burke
 Joe Swail 4–3 Michael White

Group R

 David Hogan 4–2 Jim Stewart
 Alex Higgins 0–4 Alex O'Donoghue
 Michael Holt 4–0 Jim Stewart
 Michael Holt 4–0 Alex Higgins
 David Hogan 4–1 Alex O'Donoghue
 Michael Holt 4–0 Alex O'Donoghue
 Alex Higgins 4–0 Jim Stewart
 David Hogan 4–2 Alex Higgins
 Alex O'Donoghue 4–0 Jim Stewart
 Michael Holt 4–3 David Hogan

Group S

 Anthony O'Connor 4–2 Karl Ellis
 Stephen Lee 4–2 Michael Wasley
 Anthony O'Connor 4–3 Hugh Murdock
 Michael Wasley 4–0 Hugh Murdock
 Stephen Lee 4–1 Karl Ellis
 Anthony O'Connor 2–4 Michael Wasley
 Stephen Lee 4–1 Hugh Murdock
 Michael Wasley 4–1 Karl Ellis
 Hugh Murdock 0–4 Karl Ellis
 Stephen Lee 4–0 Anthony O'Connor

Group T

 Darren Dornan 4–0 Gary Walsh
 Marc Davis 3–4 Philip Browne
 Darren Dornan 2–4 Philip Browne
 Matthew Stevens 4–3 Marc Davis
 Matthew Stevens 4–0 Gary Walsh
 Matthew Stevens 4–2 Philip Browne
 Marc Davis 4–3 Gary Walsh
 Philip Browne 4–0 Gary Walsh
 Matthew Stevens 4–1 Darren Dornan
 Darren Dornan 4–2 Marc Davis

Group V

 Peter Bullen 4–0 Ray Power
 Nigel Bond 4–0 Gennaro Delvecchio
 Robert Milkins 4–1 Peter Bullen
 Nigel Bond 2–4 Robert Milkins
 Gennaro Delvecchio 4–3 Ray Power
 Peter Bullen 4–2 Gennaro Delvecchio
 Robert Milkins 4–0 Ray Power
 Nigel Bond 4–0 Ray Power
 Nigel Bond 4–0 Peter Bullen
 Robert Milkins 4–0 Gennaro Delvecchio

Group W

 Shane O'Mahoney 3–4 Ross Higgins
 Jason Waters 1–4 Barry Pinches
 Barry Pinches 4–2 Shane O'Mahoney
 Jason Waters 4–1 Brendan Murphy
 Jason Waters 4–0 Ross Higgins
 Shane O'Mahoney 4–3 Brendan Murphy
 Barry Pinches 4–0 Ross Higgins
 Jason Waters 4–0 Shane O'Mahoney
 Ross Higgins 4–2 Brendan Murphy
 Barry Pinches 4–1 Brendan Murphy

Group X

 Richie Flynn 2–4 Gerard Greene
 Greg Batten 4–2 Joe Charles
 Richie Flynn 3–4 Joe Charles
 Gerard Greene 3–4 Mark Davis
 Mark Davis 4–1 Greg Batten
 Mark Davis 4–0 Joe Charles
 Mark Davis 4–0 Richie Flynn
 Gerard Greene 4–3 Greg Batten
 Mark Davis 4–3 Gerard Greene
 Richie Flynn 4–1 Greg Batten

Group Y

 Kieran McMahon 4–1 Kieran O'Leary
 John Lynch 4–0 Imran Faood
 Marcus Campbell 4–0 Imran Faood
 Marcus Campbell 4–1 Kieran McMahon
 John Lynch 2–4 Kieran O'Leary
 Kieran McMahon 4–0 John Lynch
 Kieran O'Leary 0–4 Marcus Campbell
 Kieran McMahon 4–0 Imran Faood
 Marcus Campbell 4–0 John Lynch
 Kieran O'Leary 4–0 Imran Faood

Group Z

 Shachur Ruberg 4–0 Lewis Miles
 Ken Doherty 4–1 John McBride
 Leonard Shanahan 4–0 Lee Gorton
 Ken Doherty 4–0 Lee Gorton
 Leonard Shanahan 4–2 John McBride
 Shachur Ruberg 0–4 John McBride
 Ken Doherty 4–0 Shachaur Ruberg
 Leonard Shanahan 4–1 Lewis Miles
 Lewis Miles 4–1 Lee Gorton
 Ken Doherty 4–0 Leonard Shanahan
 John McBride 4–1 Lee Gorton
 Ken Doherty 4–2 Lewis Miles
 Leonard Shanahan 4–2 Shachur Ruberg
 Lewis Miles 4–3 John McBride
 Shachur Ruberg 4–0 Lee Gorton

Knock-out stage

Top half

Section 1

Section 2

Section 3

Section 4

Bottom half

Section 5

Section 6

Section 7

Section 8

Finals

Notable breaks

Maximum breaks
(Note: a maximum break in six-reds is 75 points.)
 Michael White (2 minutes 28 seconds)
 Mark King (3 minutes 12 seconds)
 David Morris (3 minutes 25 seconds)
 Ken Doherty (3 minutes 28 seconds)
 John Higgins (3 minutes 38 seconds)
 Mark Joyce (4 minutes 44 seconds)
 Barry Pinches (4 minutes 53 seconds)

Seven-red clearances
 78 points Ricky Walden
 76 points Robert Milkins (4 minutes 18 seconds)
 75 points Mark King (3 minutes 12 seconds)

Notes

 Michael White compiled the fastest maximum break in six-red snooker, it took 2 minutes and 28 seconds.

References

2009
Six-red World Championships
Six-red World Championship, 2009
Six-red World Championship, 2009
World championships in snooker
Six-red snooker competitions